"Blue on Black" is a song by American blues rock group Kenny Wayne Shepherd Band.  Written by Shepherd with Mark Selby and Tia Sillers, it was originally released on their second studio album, Trouble Is... (1997). In 1998, the song was released as a single and reached the top position on the US Billboard Hot Mainstream Rock Tracks chart.

"Blue on Black" was regarded as the best rock song of 1998 by various media. It won the Billboard Music Award for "Rock Track of the Year" and the song's popularity helped make Trouble Is... the 1999 "Blues Album of the Year" in Billboard. The song continues to be a top download of the Kenny Wayne Shepherd catalog, ranking at number one on Rhapsody. It is also his most-listened to song on Spotify with over 26 million streams.

In 2019, Shepherd teamed up with American heavy metal band Five Finger Death Punch, along with country singer Brantley Gilbert and Queen guitarist Brian May for a reworked version of "Blue on Black". It also performed well on the record charts and proceeds were donated to the Gary Sinise Foundation to benefit first responders.

Composition
In an August 2017 interview, Shepherd discussed the song's origins:

Performance and personnel
As Shepherd's signature song, he often closes his concert performances with "Blue on Black", just prior to "Voodoo Child". The Jimi Hendrix cover was also included on the CD single with an alternate mix of "Blue on Black".

 Kenny Wayne Shepherd – lead guitar
 Noah Hunt – lead vocals
 Joe Nadaeu – rhythm guitar
 Jimmy Wallace – keyboards
 Robby Emerson – bass guitar
 Sam Bryant – drums, percussion

Charts and recognition
Shepherd discussed the song's commercial significance in an interview:

"Blue on Black" reached number 78 on the Billboard Hot 100 singles chart.  It also reached the top position on the magazine's Mainstream Rock Tracks chart. A review in Billboard, described the song as a "widely appealing meld of brooding southern rock, searing blues guitar and alt-country touches".

In honor of the hit single, the Martin Guitar Company issued its Kenny Wayne Shepherd Limited Edition Signature model JC-16KWS, a distinct jumbo model in dark blue, in January 2001. The guitar design was inspired by the imagery evoked in the song's lyrics. Proceeds from the model were to be donated to Providence House, a Shreveport, Louisiana shelter and development program for homeless families with children.

Five Finger Death Punch version 

American heavy metal band Five Finger Death Punch recorded "Blue on Black" for their 2018 album And Justice for None. However, on April 12, 2019, a version different to the one on that album, was released as a single, together with Kenny Shepherd, country musician Brantley Gilbert and Queen guitarist Brian May. It merged Sheperd's blues rock, Gilbert's country, May's classic rock and Five Finger Death Punch's mainstream rock styles.

An official music video was released on April 11, 2019. Proceeds from the song were donated to the Gary Sinise Foundation to benefit first responders. This version debuted and peaked at number two on the US Digital Song Sales chart and number 66 on the Billboard Hot 100, marking Five Finger Death Punch's first visit to the latter list since 2011 and also became the band's record-extending tenth Hard Rock Digital Song Sales number one. It also topped the Billboard Mainstream Rock Songs chart for five non-consecutive weeks.

Personnel
 Ivan Moody – co-lead vocals
 Jason Hook – lead guitar, backing vocals
 Zoltan Bathory – rhythm guitar
 Chris Kael – bass guitar, backing vocals
 Jeremy Spencer – drums, percussion
 Brantley Gilbert – co-lead vocals
 Kenny Wayne Shepherd – first guitar solo, backing vocals
 Brian May – second guitar solo

See also
List of Billboard Mainstream Rock number-one songs of the 1990s

References

External links

Blues songs
American rock songs
1998 singles
Song recordings produced by Jerry Harrison
Songs written by Tia Sillers
Songs written by Mark Selby (musician)
Vocal collaborations